Amos Hadar ( 7 September 1923 – 13 January 2014) was an Israeli politician who served as a member of the Knesset for the Alignment between 1974 and 1981.

Biography
Born Amos Horowitz in Nahalal during the Mandate era, Hadar was a cousin of Moshe Dayan. During his youth he was a member of the HaNoar HaOved youth movement. He joined the British Army and fought in World War II, and served as a platoon commander during the 1948 Arab–Israeli War, during which he was involved in battles in the Jordan Valley and Mishmar HaEmek. He became secretary of the Nahalal moshav, and also volunteered for the Bnei HaMoshavim movement in the Negev during the 1960s. In 1964, he became secretary of the Economic Committee of the Moshavim Movement, and the following year joined the new Rafi party. His brother Yigal was also involved in politics, and became a Knesset member in 1969 and later served as a minister.

In 1973 Amos was on the Alignment list (an alliance of the Labor Party, which Rafi had merged into in 1968, and Mapam) for the elections that year, but failed to win a seat. However, he entered the Knesset on 8 April the following year as a replacement for Uzi Feinerman. He was re-elected in 1977, but lost his seat in the 1981 elections.

Between 1982 and 1985, he served as secretary general of the Moshavim Movement. He died in 2014 at the age of 90, and was buried in Nahalal.

References

External links
 

1923 births
2014 deaths
People from Nahalal
Jews in Mandatory Palestine
British Army personnel of World War II
Israeli soldiers
Alignment (Israel) politicians
Rafi (political party) politicians
Members of the 8th Knesset (1974–1977)
Members of the 9th Knesset (1977–1981)